Üner Teoman (born 10 October 1932) is a Turkish sprinter. She competed in the women's 100 metres at the 1948 Summer Olympics.

References

External links
 

1932 births
Living people
Athletes (track and field) at the 1948 Summer Olympics
Turkish female sprinters
Olympic athletes of Turkey
Place of birth missing (living people)
Olympic female sprinters